KivuWatt Power Station is a  methane gas-fired thermal power plant in Rwanda.

Location

Overview

KivuWatt project will extract methane from the waters of Lake Kivu and use the gas to generate electricity. The generated power will be purchased by Rwanda Electricity Corporation (RECO), the Rwandan electricity utility.

The $200 million project, owned by ContourGlobal and executed in cooperation with Wärtsilä, is expected to add 26MW of generating capacity in its first phase (ongoing now) and eventually scale up to 100MW in the coming years. In a developed country, the current 25MW would provide enough energy for 45,000 people.

Phase 1 of the project, with capacity of 25MW, was expected to start commercial operation in 2012. Phase 2 of the project, with additional capacity of 75 MW, is expected to start construction six months after the commissioning of Phase 1. The project is being developed by KivuWatt Limited, a subsidiary of ContourGlobal, under a concession agreement made with the Government of Rwanda in 2009. KivuWatt Limited plans to extract some of the estimated 60 billion cubic meters of methane gas trapped under Lake Kivu and convert that gas into electricity, something that has not been done on a large commercial scale before. Construction concluded in November 2015 and the power station was under testing and calibration from November 2015 until commissioning in June 2016.

The KivuWatt power plant was inaugurated by Rwanda's president Paul Kagame on 16 May 2016.

See also

References

External links
 Rwanda harnesses lake "demons" to power the economy
 KivuWatt Power Project, Rwanda
 KivuWatt Machinery Worth Rwf700 Million Stuck In Kenya Over Dispute 
 Lake Kivu’s Great Gas Gamble
 Killer Lake's renewable potential

2015 establishments in Rwanda
Natural gas-fired power stations in Rwanda